Carlos Bellvís Llorens (born 24 April 1985) is a Spanish professional footballer. On the left flank, he can play as either a defender or a midfielder.

Club career
After emerging through local Valencia CF's youth system, Valencia-born Bellvís made his professional debut for Valencian Community neighbours Elche CF, playing two seasons on loan in the second division. Subsequently, he moved in the same situation to CD Numancia, making his La Liga debut on 31 August 2008 in a shock 1–0 home win against FC Barcelona.

After Numancia's relegation, Bellvís cut all ties with Valencia and signed a three-year contract for CD Tenerife in mid-July 2009. He suffered two consecutive relegations with the Canary Islands club, being only a backup in both seasons.

After contributing 21 matches as his next team, RC Celta de Vigo, returned to the top flight at the end of the 2011–12 campaign as runners-up, Bellvís was only third or fourth choice in the following years, being deployed occasionally as a right-back and also suffering a fracture to his zygomatic bone in September 2013 during a match at Getafe CF, after a collision with Diego Castro. After leaving in January 2014 he resumed his career in the second tier, with SD Ponferradina and AD Alcorcón.

References

External links

Celta de Vigo biography 

1985 births
Living people
Spanish footballers
Footballers from Valencia (city)
Association football defenders
Association football midfielders
La Liga players
Segunda División players
Tercera División players
Valencia CF Mestalla footballers
Valencia CF players
Elche CF players
CD Numancia players
CD Tenerife players
RC Celta de Vigo players
SD Ponferradina players
AD Alcorcón footballers